Iskenderun Naval Base is a base of the Turkish Navy on the north-eastern coast of Mediterranean Sea,  east by north-east of Iskanderun, Hatay Province in southern Turkey. It is assigned to Turkish Navy's Southern Sea Area Command. The base is adjacent to the Port of Iskenderun.

Iskenderun Naval Training Center

At the Iskenderun 1st Seamen Training Brigade, Between 2,500 and 5,000 recruits are trained twice a year in shipboard duties and also marine operations that last 45 days. More than 1.5 million seamen recruits were trained and graduated from the training center in Iskenderun since its establishment in 1953.

Other two naval training centers, both in battalion size, are located in Sarıyer, Istanbul and in Izmir.

Iskenderun Naval Hospital 
Iskenderun Naval Hospital, with its 200 beds, serves all the naval facilities in Iskenderun.

Iskenderun Naval Museum 
On June 26, 2009, Iskenderun Naval Base Command opened Turkey's third naval museum in the city center of İskenderun. At the museum, works and objects are exhibited from the Ottoman Navy and Hatay Republic era beside the Turkish Navy's. Other Turkish naval museums are located in Beşiktaş, Istanbul and Çanakkale.

References 

Turkish Navy bases
Economy of Hatay
Military in Hatay
Buildings and structures in Hatay Province